Brahin is a meteorite pallasite found in 1810.
This is the second meteorite ever found in Russia.
Sometimes it is also called Bragin or Bragim.
It is quite common among collectors due to the affordable price of small partial slices.

History
The meteorites were sent to scientists by the administrator of the district: Graf Rakitsky, State Advisor and Ex Honorio Inspector of The Schools Of Rechitsky Uezd. Since 1807 several masses were recovered from the site.

During World War II, samples of Brahin were stolen in Kiev by German soldiers and some samples disappeared also in Minsk.

Composition and classification
Brahin is a Main Group pallasite, with angular shaped olivine embedded in an iron-nickel matrix. Olivine crystals represent about 37% of the weight of the meteorite.

Pallasites are not common; they compose only 1.8% of all known meteorites. 
It has been proposed that pallasites represents the interface between the stone mantle and the metal core of differentiated asteroids.

Strewn field

The area was contaminated in 1986 during the Chernobyl disaster and falls now in the Periodic Control Zone. Post-accident recovered meteorites are safe and not contaminated because the radiation affects only the first few inches of soil, nevertheless meteorite hunting in the area is not entirely safe.

See also 
 Glossary of meteoritics

Notes

External links 
 Meteoritical Bulletin Database

Meteorites found in Belarus
Geography of Belarus